David John White (born 26 June 1961) is a former New Zealand cricketer who played in two Test matches and three One Day Internationals in 1990.

Domestically, White played 99 first-class matches for Northern Districts. White also played for Poverty Bay and the Bay of Plenty in the Hawke Cup.

A former leading rugby administrator, David White has also served as chief executive of New Zealand Cricket.

References

1961 births
Living people
New Zealand Test cricketers
New Zealand One Day International cricketers
New Zealand cricketers
Northern Districts cricketers
Cricketers from Gisborne, New Zealand